Kisses on the Forehead is a 1996 Argentine drama film written and directed by Carlos Galettini and starring China Zorrilla and Leonardo Sbaraglia. The film is based in the play by Jacobo Langsner Una margarita llamada Mercedes, which he wrote for (and was premiered by) Zorrilla, about the love between a high-class old Grand-Dame and a young writer just arrived from Montevideo to Buenos Aires City. The film premiered on 5 September 1996 in Buenos Aires and was nominated for two Silver Condor Awards in 1997.

Cast 
 China Zorrilla ... Mercedes Arévalo
 Leonardo Sbaraglia ... Sebastián Miguez
 Claudio García Satur ... Fabio
 Carolina Papaleo ... Estela
 Alejandra Flechner ... Casilda
 Mabel Manzotti ... Raquel
 Leonardo Abremor ... Musical Director
 Daniel Alvaredo ... Driver
 Gustavo Bucciarelli ... Soundman
 Henan Carbonero ... Kid
 Fernanda Caride ... Silvia
 Dario Casas ... Gardner
 Lorena Colotta ... Musician 3
 Daniel Di Biase ... Doctor (as Daniel Dibiase)
 Jorge Dorio ... Raquel's husband
 Lucio Herrera ... Musician 2
 Cecilia Labourt ... Mercedes' Mother
 Hilda Mantovani ... Woman in Pension
 Alberto Mariotti ... Musician 1
 Nieves Martín ... Grandma Mercedes
 Francisco Nápoli ... Director de Cine
 Germán Palacios ... Young Protagonist in The Film
 Melina Petriella ... Young Mercedes
 Angela Ragno ... Woman Protagonist in The Film
 Pablo Rinaldi ... Mercedes' Father
 Erica Rivas ... Laura
 César Vianco ... Pedro Luis
 Leonardo Lin ... Double of light of Leonardo Sbaraglia

External links 
 

Argentine drama films
1996 films
1990s Spanish-language films
1996 drama films
Spanish drama films
Films directed by Carlos Galettini
1990s Argentine films